A Gymnich meeting is an informal meeting of the foreign ministers of the member states of the European Union, organized according to the rotating Presidency of the Council of the European Union since 1974 (every six months). The ministers are not accompanied by their assistants, which makes the condition easier for informal and frank exchange of views.

Meetings

2022
 Prague: 30 and 31 August
 Brest: 13 and 14 January

2020
 Berlin: 27 and 28 August

2019 
 Bucharest: 31 January–1 February
 Helsinki: 29–30 August

2018
 Sofia: 15–16 February
 Vienna: 30–31 August

2017
 Valletta: 28 April
 Tallinn: 7–8 September

2016
 Amsterdam: 5–6 February
Bratislava: 2–3 September

2015
 Riga: 6–7 March
 Luxembourg: 4–5 September

2012
 Aphrodite Hills Resort, Pafos: 7 and 8 September

See also
Foreign Affairs Council

References

Further reading
Patrick Roger, « La très couteuse présidence française de l'Union européenne », Le Monde, 2009-10-29
 William Wallace: "Regional Integration: The West European Experience Transaction Publishers 1994  p. 46
 Clifford P. Hackett: "Cautious Revolution: The European Union Arrives"  p. 175
Christopher Hill, Karen Elizabeth Smith: "European Foreign Policy: Key Documents"  p. 97
Jeremy John Richardson: "European Union: Power and Policy-making"  p. 154

Foreign relations of the European Union
Council of the European Union